Krňany is a municipality and village in Benešov District in the Central Bohemian Region of the Czech Republic. It has about 500 inhabitants.

Administrative parts
Villages of Teletín and Třebsín are administrative parts of Krňany.

References

Villages in Benešov District